Arctostaphylos myrtifolia is a rare species of manzanita known by the common name Ione manzanita. It is endemic to the Sierra Nevada foothills of California. It grows in the chaparral and woodland plant community on a distinctive acidic soil series in western Amador and Calaveras Counties. There are only about 17 occurrences, but the plant is abundant in some areas of its limited range. This is a federally listed threatened species.

Description
Arctostaphylos myrtifolia is a red-barked, bristly shrub reaching just over a meter in maximum height. The small bright green leaves are coated in tiny glandular hairs and are shiny but rough in texture. They are less than 2 centimeters long. The inflorescence is a raceme of urn-shaped manzanita flowers on bright red branches. The fruit is a cylindrical drupe only a few millimeters long.

Conservation
A major threat to this rare endemic plant is a pair of fungal diseases. A branch canker caused by species of Fusicoccum, including F. aesculi, causes some mortality, and root and crown rot caused by Phytophthora cinnamomi has destroyed entire stands of the manzanita and prevented its regrowth in patches of infested soil. These microorganisms, as well as a newly identified one, Phytophthora cambivora, are spreading rapidly and may soon reach the entire range of the plant's distribution. Because of this threat, which may lead to the extinction of the species, the United States Fish and Wildlife Service has recommended that it be upgraded from threatened to endangered status.

See also
California chaparral and woodlands
California interior chaparral and woodlands

References

External links
 Calflora Database: Arctostaphylos myrtifolia (Ione manzanita)
Jepson Manual Treatment - Arctostaphylos myrtifolia
USDA Plants Profile; Arctostaphylos myrtifolia
Arctostaphylos myrtifolia - Photo gallery

myrtifolia
Endemic flora of California
Flora of the Sierra Nevada (United States)
Natural history of the California chaparral and woodlands
Natural history of Amador County, California
Natural history of Calaveras County, California
Plants described in 1887
Critically endangered flora of California